Kacheh Gonbad (also known as Gacheh Gonbad, Gacheh Gunbād, and Gecheh Gonbad) is a village in Pir Taj Rural District, Chang Almas District, Bijar County, Kurdistan Province, Iran. At the 2006 census, its population was 168, in 31 families. The village is populated by Azerbaijanis.

References 

Towns and villages in Bijar County
Azerbaijani settlements in Kurdistan Province